Bittern railway station is located on the Stony Point line in Victoria, Australia. It serves the town of Bittern, and it opened on 17 December 1889.

History

Bittern station opened on 17 December 1889, when the railway line from Hastings was extended to Stony Point. Like the town itself, the station was named after the bird family of the same name.

Between 1921 and 1953, Bittern was the junction station for a branch line to Red Hill.

On 22 June 1981, the passenger service between Frankston and Stony Point was withdrawn and replaced with a bus service, with the line between Long Island Junction and Stony Point also closing on the same day. On 16 September 1984, promotional trips for the reopening of the line began and, on 27 September of that year, the passenger service was reinstated. Also in that year, flashing light signals were provided at the nearby Woolleys Road level crossing, located nearby in the Down direction of the station. In February 1986, the current passenger shelters were provided, replacing the original timber station building.

In 1991, a siding at the station was abolished.

In 2010, boom barriers were provided at the Woolleys Road level crossing.

Platforms and services

Bittern has one platform. It is serviced by Metro Trains' Stony Point line services.

Platform 1:
  all stations services to Frankston; all stations services to Stony Point

Transport links

Ventura Bus Lines operates one route via Bittern station, under contract to Public Transport Victoria:
 : Frankston station – Flinders

References

External links
 Melway map at street-directory.com.au

Railway stations in Melbourne
Railway stations in Australia opened in 1889
Railway stations in the Shire of Mornington Peninsula